The Moreton Bay Classic ('MBC') is a yearly fishing tournament run by Brisbane Fishing Online held in Moreton Bay in South East Queensland, Australia. The event (which went from one to two days duration in 2009), takes place in May.   In 2009, the tournament expanded from two prize categories to eight.    In 2010, prize categories were re-evaluated resulting in a solid five categories rendering fierce competition between anglers.

The tournament is a Photo and Release event, whereby no fish are required to be removed from the location they are caught. A photo is taken of the fish and then the fish can be released following responsible fishing guidelines encouraged by the Qld Fisheries's Survival Guide. This is responsible fishing and as such is one of the leading fishing tournaments in Australia that is promoting sustainable and healthy fishing practices.

Current Moreton Bay Classic Prize Categories

Previous Moreton Bay Classic Prize Categories

Moreton Bay Classic Fishing Tournament Results

Similar Events
Other fishing tournaments with a similar format are the Brisbane River Classic and State of Origin fishing competition.

References

Sports competitions in Queensland
Recreational fishing in Australia
Fishing tournaments
Moreton Bay